Mireille Joseph (born 25 April 1955) is a Haitian sprinter. She competed in the women's 100 metres at the 1972 Summer Olympics. She was the first woman to represent Haiti at the Olympics.

References

1955 births
Living people
Athletes (track and field) at the 1972 Summer Olympics
Haitian female sprinters
Olympic athletes of Haiti
Place of birth missing (living people)